Big Girl, Little Girl is a 2004 British short film directed by Amelia Hann.

Synopsis
The film revolves around the seven-year-old character called Lucy, who is in love with her uncle. Lucy tries to compete with his girlfriend in order to gain his affection.

Cast 
 Molly McMorrow as Lucy.
 Dan Antopolski as Uncle Olly.
 Melanie Gutteridge as Clare.
 Robert Reina as Eric.
 Donna McCabe as Anne.
 Lorna Fitzgerald as Katie.

Reception 
The film was received by the public without much criticism.

Awards
Big Girl, Little Girl was nominated for two awards, one of which it has one. It won 'Best Director' in the Strasbourg Film Festival (II) in 2004, but failed to win 'Best Short Film' in the San Francisco Short Film Festival in the same year.

External links

References

Further reading 
 

2004 films
2004 short films
British short films